The Museum of Old Taiwan Tiles is an art museum in West District, Chiayi City, Taiwan.

History
The museum building used to be a timber storage building during the Japanese rule of Taiwan. The museum founder James Hsu and his friends collected resources to purchase and renovate the building in 2015. In the same year, the museum building received subsidies for renovation from Chiayi City Government.

Exhibitions
The museum exhibits more than 4,000 pieces of classical style of tiles, especially from the year 1915–1935.

Transportation
The museum is accessible within walking distance northeast of Chiayi Station of Taiwan Railways.

See also
 List of museums in Taiwan

References

External links
  

Art museums and galleries in Taiwan
Museums in Chiayi
West District